Davoli is a surname. Notable people with the surname include:

Angelo Davoli (1896-1978), Italian middle-distance runner 
Bob Davoli, American venture capitalist
Daniela Davoli (born 1957), Italian pop singer-songwriter
Matilde Davoli (born 1982), Italian indie-pop songwriter, producer and sound engineer
Ninetto Davoli (born 1948), Italian actor